Orlovka is a rural locality (a selo) in Volnensky Selsoviet of Arkharinsky District, Amur Oblast, Russia. The population was 41 as of 2018. There are 2 streets.

Geography 
Orlovka is located on the right bank of the Arkhara River, 18 km southwest of Arkhara (the district's administrative centre) by road. Volnoye is the nearest rural locality.

References 

Rural localities in Arkharinsky District